DIW Records is a Japanese record label specializing in avant-garde jazz. It is a subsidiary of Disk Union. Kazunori Sugiyama was an executive producer for the label before starting Tzadik Records with John Zorn.

DIW's name stands for "Discs in the World" and is from a music magazine sold at Disk Union stores that announced the latest releases from American and European labels. Wilber Morris recorded the first album for DIW in 1983 in New York City. The catalogue includes music by the Art Ensemble of Chicago, Lester Bowie, James Carter, Steve Grossman, Harold Mabern, David Murray, James Blood Ulmer, David S. Ware, Rodney Whitaker, and John Zorn.

Discography

References 

Japanese record labels
Jazz record labels